Maung Ko is a member of State Administration Council of Myanmar. He was a former chief minister of Mandalay Region. He has served as chairman of Mandalay Region Administration Council, sub-council of State Administration Council, from 2 February 2021 to 1 August 2021. He is also a patron of the Mandalay Region Chamber of Commerce and Industry (MRCCI).

Chairman and Chief Minister
He was appointed as the chairman of Mandalay Region Administration Council by SAC Chairman Min Aung Hlaing. On 1 August 2021, the State and Region Administration Councils are dissolved and State and Region Governments are reformed. Maung Ko was appointed as the head of Mandalay Region Government and became the 3rd Chief Minister of Mandalay Region.

U.S. sanctions 
On 10 December 2021, the U.S. Department of the Treasury added Maung Ko to its Specially Designated Nationals (SDN) list. Individuals on the list have their assets blocked and U.S. persons are generally prohibited from dealing with them.

References

Region or state chief ministers of Myanmar
Year of birth missing (living people)
Living people
Specially Designated Nationals and Blocked Persons List
Recipients of the Wunna Kyawhtin
Individuals related to Myanmar sanctions